State Route 531 (SR 531) is an east–west state highway in the U.S. state of Ohio.  The western terminus of State Route 531 is at the northern terminus of State Route 534 in Geneva-on-the-Lake, at a curve along Lake Road.  The route's eastern terminus is at the northern terminus of State Route 7, at a signalized intersection in Conneaut.

Following mostly along the Lake Erie shoreline, it is named Lake Road for most of its length.  Due to its proximity to the shoreline, sections west of Ashtabula have had to be re-routed as a result of lake erosion.  The route crosses the Ashtabula River in Ashtabula via a Strauss bascule bridge, the Ashtabula lift bridge.

Route description
The entirety of State Route 531 is situated in the northern portion of Ashtabula County.  No portion of State Route 531 is included within the National Highway System.

History
State Route 531 made its debut in 1937 along the routing that it currently utilizes between State Route 534 and State Route 7. It has not experienced any major changes since it was established. SR 531 is currently receiving slope erosion repairs, starting from Myers Road to Nineveh Road. The project started in May 2013, and is expected to finished in September 2014.

Major intersections

References

531
Transportation in Ashtabula County, Ohio